Thunder Glacier is located on the west slopes of Mount Baker in the North Cascades of the U.S. state of Washington. The glacier descends to the west on the north side of the Black Buttes.

See also 
List of glaciers in the United States

References 

Glaciers of Mount Baker
Glaciers of Washington (state)